Marcin Mrożek (born 26 February 1990) is a Polish former cyclist, who rode professionally for UCI Professional Continental team , in 2016 and 2017.

Major results

2013
 6th Trofeo Internazionale Bastianelli
2014
 10th Trofeo Internazionale Bastianelli
2015
 9th Giro del Medio Brenta
2016
 10th Korona Kocich Gór

References

External links

1990 births
Living people
Polish male cyclists
People from Wadowice County
Sportspeople from Lesser Poland Voivodeship
21st-century Polish people